Charles Bray (6 April 1898 – 12 September 1993) was an English cricketer and journalist.

Bray played for Essex between 1927 and 1937. His highest score was 129, saving the match after Essex followed on against the New Zealanders in 1931. He captained the county intermittently and later wrote the volume Essex from 'The County Cricket Series' published in 1950 by Convoy Publications Ltd.

He wrote for the Daily Herald from 1935 to 1964, and subsequently as a freelance for The Sun, covering cricket and rugby union. For his work as a war correspondent during the Second World War he was mentioned in despatches. He was chairman of the Cricket Writers' Club in 1953. His brother, Leslie Bray, also played first-class cricket.

Footnotes

References

External links

1898 births
1993 deaths
Sportspeople from Brighton
English cricketers
English cricketers of 1919 to 1945
Essex cricketers
British sportswriters
Cricket historians and writers
English male journalists
English war correspondents
War correspondents of World War II